Kalanguya, also called Kallahan,  is a dialect cluster spoken by the Kalanguya people of northern Luzon, Philippines.

Distribution
Kalanguya (also called Ikalahan, Kalangoya, Kalangoya-Ikalahan, Kallahan, Kayapa) is spoken in the following locations:
western Nueva Vizcaya Province
Ifugao Province (Hungduan municipality)
Benguet Province (Bokod municipality)
northeastern Pangasinan Province (San Nicolas municipality)
north Nueva Ecija Province (Carranglan municipality)

The dialects of Kalanguya are
Central Kalanguya (Kayapa)
Northern Kalanguya (Ambaguio, Tinoc)
Southern Kalanguya (Santa Fe)
Western Kalanguya (Benguet)

Keley-i Kallahan (also called Antipolo Ifugao, Hanalulo, Keley-i, Keley-i Kalanguya, Keleyqiq Ifugao) is spoken in the Kiangan and Aritao municipalities of Ifugao Province. Its dialects are Bayninan and Ya-Tuka.

References

Further reading

External links
Online version of Hohulin et al.'s (2018) dictionary hosted by SIL International

Languages of Benguet
Languages of Nueva Vizcaya
South–Central Cordilleran languages